Jacobus Paulus (JP) Nel (born 9 January 1981) is a former South African rugby union footballer, who regularly played as a centre.

He retired after the 2013 Currie Cup season.

References

1981 births
Living people
Afrikaner people
Blue Bulls players
Bulls (rugby union) players
Griquas (rugby union) players
People from Worcester, South Africa
Rugby league players from the Western Cape
Rugby union centres
Rugby union players from Worcester, South Africa
South Africa national rugby league team players
South African rugby league players
South African rugby union players